John Herron may refer to:

John Herron (Pittsburgh), mayor of Pittsburgh, Pennsylvania in the 1840s
John S. Herron, later mayor of Pittsburgh in the 1930s
John Herron (Alberta politician), former Canadian Member of Parliament from Alberta in the early 1900s
John Herron (New Brunswick politician), former Canadian Member of Parliament from New Brunswick in the 1990s
John Herron (Australian politician), former Australian Senator
John Herron (footballer), Scottish footballer

See also
John Heron (disambiguation)